Kim Dong-hyun (born May 20, 1984) is a Korean former football player who was expelled from K-League after being implicated in the match-fixing scandal.

Club career

Oita 
Kim joined J1 League side Oita Trinita in August 2003 and started his career with the Japanese club. However, Oita announced a few months later that it had released him.

Suwon 
He signed a five-year contract with the K-League giants Suwon Samsung Bluewings shortly soon after being a free agent.

In Europe 
He has put in great performances for Suwon, Primeira Liga side SC Braga was hoping to sign with him. In December 2005 he agreed to join Braga on free transfer, signing a four-year contract.

In January 2007 he was sold by Braga back to Korea for €1.525 million.

Match fixing scandal 
He was arrested on the charge connected with the match fixing allegations on 29 May 2011. On 17 June 2011, his football career was rescinded by the Korea Professional Football League with other accomplices.

On May 26, 2012, Kim and former baseball player Yun Chan-soo kidnapped a woman surnamed Park and stole her car. In March 2013, Kim was sentenced to three years, plus five years probation.

Club statistics

National team statistics

Statistics

Goals 
Results list South Korea's goal tally first.

Personal

Match-fixing scandal 
On 1 June 2011, Kim was arrested on charges of accepting bribes from brokers and attempting to fix their games. He was in the centre of a match-fixing scandal which shook the league, introducing brokers to his teammates and providing accepting bribes to them.

On 17 June 2011, Kim's football career was rescinded by the Korea Professional Football League with other accomplices.

References

External links 
 
 National Team Player Record 
 Russian Premier League Player Profile 
 
 

1984 births
Living people
Association football forwards
South Korean footballers
South Korean expatriate footballers
South Korea international footballers
Oita Trinita players
Suwon Samsung Bluewings players
S.C. Braga players
FC Rubin Kazan players
Seongnam FC players
Gyeongnam FC players
Gimcheon Sangmu FC players
J1 League players
K League 1 players
Primeira Liga players
Russian Premier League players
Expatriate footballers in Japan
Expatriate footballers in Portugal
Expatriate footballers in Russia
South Korean expatriate sportspeople in Japan
South Korean expatriate sportspeople in Portugal
South Korean expatriate sportspeople in Russia
Hanyang University alumni
Footballers at the 2006 Asian Games
Sportspeople from Daegu
Asian Games competitors for South Korea
Sportspeople banned for life